Frederick VIII (3 June 1843 – 14 May 1912) was King of Denmark from 29 January 1906 until his death in 1912.

The eldest son of King Christian IX, nicknamed the Father-in-law of Europe, Frederick was related to royalty throughout Europe. He was heir apparent to the Danish throne and served as crown prince for more than 42 years. During the long reign of his father, he was largely excluded from influence and political power. Upon his father's death in 1906, he acceded to the throne at the advanced age of 62. In many ways, Frederick VIII was a liberal monarch who was much more favorable to the new parliamentary system introduced in 1901 than his father had been, being reform-minded and democratically inclined. Due to his late accession to the throne, however, Frederick's reign would last only six years, throughout which he was plagued by ill health.

Early life
 

Prince Frederick was born on 3 June 1843 in the Yellow Palace, an 18th-century town house at 18 Amaliegade, immediately adjacent to the Amalienborg Palace complex, the principal residence of the Danish royal family in the district of Frederiksstaden in central Copenhagen. He was the eldest son and child of Prince Christian of Schleswig-Holstein-Sonderburg-Glücksburg and Princess Louise of Hesse-Kassel-Rumpenheim. His father's family was a cadet branch of the Danish royal House of Oldenburg, which was descended from Christian III and which had ruled as non-sovereign dukes in Schleswig-Holstein for eight generations.  He was baptised with the names Christian Frederik Vilhelm Carl, and was known as Prince Frederick. To the family he was known as Fredy throughout his life.

He had five younger siblings: Alexandra (1844–1925), William (1845–1913), Dagmar (1847–1928), Thyra (1853–1933) and Valdemar (1858–1939). Although they were of royal blood, the family lived a comparatively normal life. They did not possess great wealth; their father's income from an army commission was about £800 per year and their house was a rent-free grace and favour property. Occasionally, Hans Christian Andersen was invited to call and tell the children stories before bedtime.

In 1853, it was clear that the main line of the Oldenburg dynasty would become extinct with King Frederick VII, who was elderly and childless. Frederick's mother was very close to the succession, as she was a niece of the previous Oldenburg king, Christian VIII, through his sister. With the other heirs from the House of Hesse-Kassel having renounced their claims to the Danish throne in favour of Louise, who in turn relinquished her own claim, his father was eventually chosen as the heir presumptive. Accordingly, Frederick was created a Prince of Denmark.

On 19 October 1860, he was confirmed together with his sister Princess Alexandra in the chapel of Christiansborg Palace. After his confirmation, Prince Frederick was given an extensive military education, pursuing a career in the Royal Danish Navy alongside his brother William. In 1863, Frederick was sent to study political science at the University of Oxford, but returned to Denmark upon his father becoming king in November that year. As heir apparent to the throne, he was given a seat in the State Council and subsequently assisted his father in the duties of government. In 1864, he formally took part in the Second Schleswig War against Prussia and Austria.

The crown prince was a member of the Danish Order of Freemasons, serving as its Grand Master from 1871 until his death.

Marriage

Queen Louise wanted her eldest son to marry as well as had her two daughters, Alexandra and Dagmar. Queen Victoria of the United Kingdom had two yet unmarried daughters, Princess Helena and Princess Louise, and Queen Louise planned to have Frederick marry one of them. During his stay in England, Crown Prince Frederik actually took an interest in Princess Helena, and although his feelings were reciprocated, the connection did not materialize, as Queen Victoria opposed it. Victoria did not want her daughters to marry heirs to foreign thrones, as this would force them to live abroad, instead preferring German princes who could establish homes in England. In addition, Victoria had always been pro-German and another Danish alliance (Frederick's sister, Alexandra, had married Victoria's eldest son Edward, Prince of Wales), would not have been in line with her German interests.

After this failed marriage attempt, attention turned instead to Princess Louise of Sweden and Norway, the only daughter of King Charles XV of Sweden and Norway. Princess Louise belonged to the Bernadotte dynasty, which had ruled in Sweden since 1818, when the founder, Jean-Baptiste Bernadotte, one of Napoleon Bonaparte's generals, was elected crown prince of Sweden in 1810 and later succeeded the throne as King Charles XIV John in 1818. He married Désirée Clary, who had once been engaged to the French Emperor. Charles XIV's son, Oscar I, had married Josephine of Leuchtenberg, the granddaughter of Napoleon's first wife, the Empress Josephine. King Oscar I and Queen Josephine were Princess Louise's paternal grandparents.

The marriage was suggested as a way of creating friendship between Denmark and Sweden. Relations between the two countries had been tense after Sweden had not assisted Denmark during the war with Prussia in 1864. Frederick and Louise had met for the first time in 1862, but in 1868 Frederick was invited to Sweden to get to know Louise, and their meeting was described as a success. In July 1868, Crown Prince Frederick—then 25 years old—became engaged to the 17-year-old Princess Louise. A year later they were married in the chapel at the Royal Palace in Stockholm on 28 July 1869. Louise was the first Swedish princess to be married into the Danish royal house since the Middle Ages, and the marriage was welcomed in all three Scandinavian countries as a symbol of the new Scandinavism.

 
On 10 August 1869, the newlyweds made their entrance into Copenhagen, where they received a warm welcome. As their residence, the couple was awarded Frederick VIII's Palace, an 18th century palace which forms part of the Amalienborg Palace complex in central Copenhagen. As their country residence they received Charlottenlund Palace, located on the shores of the Øresund Strait 10 kilometers north of Copenhagen. Here they had a refuge far away from court life at Amalienborg and here several of their children were born. Frederick and Louise had four sons and four daughters born between 1870 and 1890: Prince Christian, Prince Carl, Princess Louise, Prince Harald, Princess Ingeborg, Princess Thyra, Prince Gustav and Princess Dagmar. Their eldest sons, Christian and Carl, would become kings of Denmark and Norway respectively. Due to the many children, Charlottenlund Palace was rebuilt to accommodate the large family, and in 1880–81 the palace was expanded with a dome and two side wings.

Reign

On 29 January 1906, King Christian IX died peacefully at the age of 87, after a reign of 42 years. Upon his father's death, Frederick succeeded to the throne at the age of 62. He was proclaimed king from the balcony of Christian VII's Palace at Amalienborg by the Prime Minister Jens Christian Christensen as Frederick VIII.

Due to his late accession to the throne, Frederick's reign would last only six years, throughout which he was plagued by ill health. In many ways, Frederick VIII was a liberal monarch who was much more favorable to the new parliamentarian system than his father had been, being reform-minded and democratically inclined.

Death
On 14 May 1912, while on his return journey from a trip to Nice with his wife and four of his children, the king made a short stop in Hamburg, staying at the Hotel Hamburger Hof under the pseudonym "Count Kronsberg". That evening, Frederick—while incognito—went out for a stroll on the Jungfernstieg, during which he became faint and collapsed on a park bench at Gänsemarkt. He was discovered by a police officer who took him to the hospital, where he was pronounced dead; his cause of death was announced as a heart attack. As Frederick was incognito at the time and had no papers on him, his body was brought to the local morgue, where he was identified by the hotel manager the next morning.

False rumors soon began to circulate about a possible scandal involving the king, as the place where he collapsed and died at was near a well-known brothel. The local police did not disclose details about the investigation, for fear of causing distress to the royal family.

Frederick's body was transported via a special train to Travemünde, after which he was brought back to Denmark by the royal yacht Dannebrog. After lying in state at the chapel of Christiansborg Palace in Copenhagen, he was interred in Christian IX's Chapel in Roskilde Cathedral on the island of Zealand, the traditional burial site for Danish monarchs since the 15th century.

Legacy
The reigning families of Denmark, Norway, Belgium and Luxembourg are descended from King Frederick VIII; Denmark's through his eldest son Christian X, and Norway's through his second son, Haakon VII. The royal family of Belgium and grand ducal family of Luxembourg are both descended from his daughter, Princess Ingeborg of Denmark.

Honours
The Kronprins Frederiks Bro in Frederikssund and King Frederick VIII Land in Greenland are named after him.

National orders and decorations
 Knight of the Elephant, 3 June 1861
 Cross of Honour of the Order of the Dannebrog, 3 June 1861
 Grand Commander of the Dannebrog, 28 July 1869
 Commemorative Medal for the Golden Wedding of King Christian IX and Queen Louise, 1892

Foreign orders and decorations

Honorary military appointments
 Colonel-in-Chief of The Buffs (Royal East Kent Regiment), 1906 – 1914 (United Kingdom)
 À la suite of the Imperial German Navy
 Honorary General of the Swedish Army, 1891 (Sweden-Norway)

Issue

Ancestry

Notes

References

Citations

Bibliography

External links

 The Royal Lineage at the website of the Danish Monarchy
 Frederik VIII at the website of the Royal Danish Collection at Amalienborg Palace
 

1843 births
1912 deaths
Sons of kings
Crown Princes of Denmark
20th-century monarchs of Denmark
House of Glücksburg (Denmark)
Princes of Schleswig-Holstein-Sonderburg-Glücksburg
Danish Freemasons
Burials at Roskilde Cathedral

Grand Commanders of the Order of the Dannebrog
Recipients of the Cross of Honour of the Order of the Dannebrog
Grand Crosses of the Order of Saint Stephen of Hungary
Grand Croix of the Légion d'honneur
Knights Grand Cross of the Royal Order of Kalākaua
Recipients of the Order of the Netherlands Lion
3
3
3
Knights Grand Cross of the Order of the Immaculate Conception of Vila Viçosa
Grand Crosses of the Order of the Star of Romania
Grand Crosses of the Order of the Crown (Romania)
Knights of the Golden Fleece of Spain
Recipients of the Order of the White Eagle (Russia)
Recipients of the Order of St. Anna, 1st class
Recipients of the Order of St. Vladimir, 4th class
Honorary Knights Grand Cross of the Royal Victorian Order
Honorary Knights Grand Cross of the Order of the Bath
Extra Knights Companion of the Garter
Knights of the Order of Charles XIII
Commanders Grand Cross of the Order of the Sword
Children of Christian IX of Denmark